Awad Haj Ali Ahmed (born January 1954 in Portsudan, Sudan) Is a Sudanese academic. He has been an educator, vice chancellor of Neelain University for more than ten years, and director of the Sudanese Central Bureau of Statistics. He was a member of the Pan-African Parliament (PAP), and a chairperson of the Eastern Caucus of the PAP.

Biography 
He was awarded a PhD in computer science by Newcastle University in 1981. Ahmed's main area of study and research is Computing Science, and his minor fields are Mathematics and Statistics.

He was a professor of Computer Science. He was the vice chancellor of Neelain University 1997-2005 and 2008-2010. Ahmed is also a former director of the Sudanese Central Bureau of Statistics and he was the census controller of the 2008 Sudanese Census. From 2012 to 2016, he was a member of the Pan African Parliament and he was a chairperson of the Eastern Caucus of the Pan African Parliament.

Ahmed's employment at Al-Neelain University was terminated in 2020 due to statements he made in the "Great Secrets of Brotherhood" documentary that appeared on the Al-Arabiya station. He talked about the need for security forces to kill peaceful demonstrators of the former head of state Omar al-Bashir's regime. He has been identified as a member of the Muslim Brotherhood. Ahmed responded that his focus was on who was killing the peaceful demonstrators, and that the focus of security forces should be on protecting them from armed demonstrators.

Notes

References

External links
 Interview with Awad Haj Ali on SABC News, 2015
 Awad Hagali Ahmed at ResearchGate

Living people
Academic staff of Neelain University
1954 births